The 1954–1955 Arkansas Razorbacks men's basketball team represented the University of Arkansas in the 1954–1955 college basketball season. The Hogs were coached by Glen Rose, in his third season of his second stint as head coach of the basketball team and twelfth season overall coaching Arkansas. The Razorbacks played their home games in the Men's Gymnasium, their eighteenth and final season there before moving into what would become known as Barnhill Arena. Arkansas had an overall record of 14–9 with an 8–4 record in Southwest Conference play, finishing in a tie for second place in the league.

Roster
Roster retrieved from HogStats.com and Sports-Reference.com.

Schedule and Results

References

Arkansas Razorbacks
Arkansas Razorbacks men's basketball seasons